Rava is an island in the Croatian part of the Adriatic Sea. It is situated in the Zadar Archipelago, between Iž and Dugi Otok,  from Zadar. Its area is 3.6 km2, and it has a population of 117. The only settlements on the island are Vela Rava and Mala Rava. The island is composed of dolomite. The primary industries are agriculture (mainly olives, but some vineyards also) and fishing.

References

External links 

 Rava portal
 Site dedicated to Rava
 A page about Rava
 {English} About Rava, Vela Rava, Videos/Pictures, Kayaking

Islands of Croatia
Islands of the Adriatic Sea
Landforms of Zadar County